Yang Fangxu (born 6 October 1994) is a Chinese volleyball player. She played in the 2013 Montreux Volley Masters.

Suspension 
Fangxu tested positive for doping with erythropoietin (EPO), which stimulates the growth of oxygen-carrying red blood cells in the body. Fangxu was banned for four years (2019-2022) by the China Anti-Doping Agency (CHINADA).

Clubs
  Shandong (2011 - 2019)

References

1994 births
Living people
People from Weifang
Volleyball players from Shandong
Chinese women's volleyball players
Olympic gold medalists for China in volleyball
Volleyball players at the 2016 Summer Olympics
2016 Olympic gold medalists for China
Opposite hitters
Outside hitters
Doping cases in volleyball
21st-century Chinese women